The EmQuartier is a large shopping mall in Bangkok, Thailand opened in May 2015. It is one of three malls planned for the "EM District", along with the existing Emporium, and the EmSphere. All three buildings will total an area of 2,500,000 square feet of mixed use retail space and are located on a 50-rai plot of land adjacent to Benchasiri Park. The mall is operated by The Mall Group.

Designed by the architecture firm Leeser Architecture, the building features a 30-ft open air garden on the fifth floor, six stories of dining terraces sitting atop a helical floor slab, an eight theater cinema complex including an Imax theater as well as a pedestrian street and five-story waterfall, as well as two stories of underground parking. The mall is divided into three sections, named the Helix Quartier, the Waterfall Quartier and the Glass Quartier. 

The mall is adjacent to Phrom Phong BTS Station on the Sukhumvit Line of the BTS Skytrain.

Anchors 
 Q Stadium
 Gourmet Market
 Quarter Food Hall
 Quarter Cineart 8 Cinemas
 BNK48 Digital Live Studio (Move to MBK Center)
 Bhiraj Tower at EmQuarter

References

External links 
https://www.emquartier.co.th/

Shopping malls in Bangkok
The Mall Group
Watthana district
Shopping malls established in 2015
2015 establishments in Thailand